The Commonwealth Policy Studies Unit (CPSU) was a think-tank covering matters pertaining to the Commonwealth of Nations. It formed part of the University of London's Institute of Commonwealth Studies, itself part of the School of Advanced Study.

In 2011 the CPSU rebranded as the Commonwealth Advisory Bureau (CA/B). In April 2013 the activity of the Commonwealth Advisory Bureau was incorporated into the wider work of the Institute of Commonwealth Studies, and the separate identity of the CA/B ceased.

Structure and governance

History
The Commonwealth Policy Studies Unit was regarded as 'a widely respected authority on the Commonwealth'.  The CPSU received its go-ahead from the Institute of Commonwealth Studies (ICWS), at the end of 1998 after a feasibility study funded by the British and Canadian governments.  The only think-tank in the world dedicated to Commonwealth affairs, the Unit worked on issues of globalisation, democracy, civil society, and human rights with persons and agencies around the Commonwealth. Through the years, the CPSU has become a respected and valued part of the Commonwealth family, working closely with Commonwealth governments, the Commonwealth Secretariat and the Commonwealth Foundation. In addition to a range of projects, the Unit produced a Commonwealth Ministerial Policy Brief ahead of every Commonwealth Ministerial Meeting, as well as for the Commonwealth Heads of Government Meetings.

Mission
The mission of CPSU was to act as a think-tank for the entire Commonwealth.  The CPSU stimulated debate, enquiry, and the sharing of ideas and information across the Commonwealth.  CPSU fulfilled its mission primarily through ongoing programmes for externally funded research projects, a series of events, and an extensive body of briefings and publications.  CPSU projects aimed to change the way people thought, for instance, about youth engagement, legal reform, international aid architecture, food security and assisting developing and small island states to maximise the opportunities of globalisation.  CPSU conducts a wide range of first class policy studies on issues of wide concern.  In addition, CPSU raised the quality of policy-making by governments, intergovernmental organisations, business and civil society, and local communities.

Governance
The CPSU, starting small on the basis of project funding,  kept its governance arrangements simple.  As of June 2008 the unit had a staff of ten people, including two interns.  CPSU has an international advisory board chaired by Lord Chidgey, which for specified purposes may be regarded as a subcommittee of the Advisory Council of the Institute of Commonwealth Studies.

Former projects
CPSU conducted research to inform and influence policy makers in over a quarter of the world's countries. Previous projects include work on Gun Culture in Commonwealth urban areas, Commonwealth Membership, UN Reform, Corporate Social Responsibility, Fisheries, Youth Engagement, and Water-related Conflict and Security. With projects such as these, CPSU put the policy choices before the Commonwealth into sharper focus, exploring options and suggesting new directions.

The CPSU ran conferences, dialogues, workshops and seminars which are typically held at the Institute of Commonwealth Studies.  Most events were by invitation only but many were open to the public.  In addition, the Unit also ran events outside the United Kingdom in conjunction with other bodies.

Programmes
The CPSU worked across five programme area on pioneering work for the modern Commonwealth.  Within each of these programmes there were a number of projects at various stages of development:

Water & Environment Programme
	Marine Fisheries Management and Coastal Zone Communities in the Commonwealth
	Forestry & Sustainable Development: comparative case studies in the Commonwealth
	Water Security in the Commonwealth: best practise and lesson learning

Communities & Civil Society Programme
	Gun culture in Commonwealth urban areas
	Interfaith dialogue in the Commonwealth
	Digital education in Commonwealth Universities
	Think tanks in South Asia

Youth & Education Programme
	Youth engagement and CSO
	Summer Conference 2008
	Commonwealth e-Pals

Economic Development  programme
	Zimbabwe economic revival
	Policy making against corruption in SE Asia
	Odius Debt in Commonwealth countries
	IFI Reform: a Commonwealth approach
	CSR: a case study of Belize and Botswana

Governance  Programme
	Governance Network Coordinator (for ACU)
	Commonwealth membership (Rwanda & Madagascar)
	The State of Democracy in the Commonwealth
	High Level Expert Group on Policing
	CMAG policy brief

Funders and partners
The CPSU received funding from other associations and organisations around the Commonwealth. The CPSU's funders and partners include:

 Allan and Nesta Ferguson Charitable Trust
 Association of Commonwealth Universities
 Australian Government's AusAid
 Commonwealth Foundation
 Commonwealth Political Affairs Division (CPAD), Commonwealth Secretariat
 Commonwealth Scholarship Commission, Commonwealth Scholarship and Fellowship Plan
 Commonwealth Secretariat, Commonwealth Fund for Technical Cooperation
 Commonwealth-UN Co-operation for Development Department for International Development
 Department for Education and Skills, UK
 Department for Foreign Affairs and International Trade, Canada
 Department for International Development, UK
 Economic and Social Research Council
 Ford Foundation, New York; Commonwealth Parliamentary Association
 Foreign and Commonwealth Office through its Commonwealth Coordination Department
 Foreign and Commonwealth Office, Rwanda
 Foreign and Commonwealth Office, UK
 Governance and Institutional Development Division (GIDD), Commonwealth Secretariat
 Nexus Strategic Partnerships
 Routledge (Taylor & Francis)
 Trinidad and Tobago High Commission, London
 UK Constitution Department for Constitutional Affairs
 Universities and Development Association of Commonwealth Universities; British Council
 University of London Vice-Chancellor's Development Fund

See also
 Commonwealth Foundation
 Commonwealth Secretariat

External links
 Commonwealth Policy Studies Unit

References 

Commonwealth Family